Cambridge Systems Technology (CST) was a company formed in the early 1980s by ex-Torch Computers engineers David Oliver and Martin Baines, to produce peripherals for the BBC Micro, and later, with Graham Priestley, Sinclair QL microcomputers. Products included IEEE 488, floppy disk  and SCSI interfaces. Following the demise of the Sinclair QL in 1986,  CST began producing the Thor series of QL-compatible personal computers. These had limited commercial success, and CST had ceased trading by the end of the decade.

References 
 News items from The Micro User, January 1984 mentioning CST
 Binary Dinosaurs page about the CST Thor

Defunct companies based in Cambridgeshire
Defunct computer companies of the United Kingdom
Companies established in the 1980s
Companies disestablished in the 1980s
Science and technology in Cambridgeshire